Abductor muscle refers to any muscle that causes abduction and may refer to:

 Abductor digiti minimi muscle of hand
 Abductor digiti minimi muscle of foot
 Abductor hallucis muscle
 Abductor pollicis brevis muscle
 Abductor pollicis longus muscle

See also
 List of abductors of the human body

Abductors (muscles)